Viru-Nigula Parish is a rural municipality of Estonia, in Lääne-Viru County.

Settlements
Towns Kunda

Small boroughs Aseri, Viru-Nigula

Villages
Aasukalda - Aseriaru - Iila - Kabeli - Kaliküla - Kalvi - Kanguristi - Kestla - Kiviküla - Koila - Koogu - Kõrkküla - Kõrtsialuse -  Kunda - Kurna - Kutsala - Kuura - Letipea - Linnuse - Mahu - Malla - Marinu - Metsavälja - Nugeri - Ojaküla - Oru - Paasküla - Pada - Pada-Aruküla - Pärna - Pikaristi - Rannu - Samma - Selja - Siberi - Simunamäe - Toomika - Tüükri - Unukse - Varudi - Vasta - Villavere - Võrkla

Religion

Gallery

References

External links